Tracey Anne Neville  (born 21 January 1977) is a former England netball international and a former England head coach. As a player, she was a member of the England teams that won bronze medals at the 1998 Commonwealth Games and the 1999 World Netball Championships. As a head coach she guided Northern Thunder/Manchester Thunder to Netball Superleague titles in 2012 and 2014. Between 2015 and 2019 she served as England head coach. She subsequently guided England to the gold medal at the 2018 Commonwealth Games and to bronze medals at the 2015 and 2019 Netball World Cups. Neville is the twin sister of Phil, younger sister of Gary and daughter of Neville Neville.

Early life, education and family
Tracey Neville is originally from Bury, Greater Manchester. She is the daughter of Neville Neville and his wife, Jill Harper. Both of her parents worked in administration roles at Bury F.C. Her father was a commercial director while her mother served as club secretary. She is the twin sister and younger sister, respectively, of Phil and Gary Neville, the former England and Manchester United footballers. Neville attended Elton High School. She also attended the University of the West of England where she trained to be a primary school teacher. Between 2004 and 2007 she attended the University of Chester and gained a degree in Nutrition and Sports Science. On 3 March 2020 Neville gave birth to her first child.

Playing career

YWCA Bury
Neville began her senior netball playing career with YWCA Bury. Neville was just one of several England netball internationals to get their start at the club based in Bury, Greater Manchester. Others included Karen Atkinson, Natalie Haythornthwaite and Jodie Gibson.

Australia
Neville spent the 2000 season in Australia where she played for Contax in the South Australia Farmers Union League and for Adelaide Thunderbirds in the Commonwealth Bank Trophy league. Together with Laura and Natalie von Bertouch, Neville was a member of the Contax team that won the Farmers Union League title.

Northern Thunder
Between 2001 and 2004 Neville played for Northern Thunder in the Super Cup. Other Northern Thunder players from the Super Cup era included Amanda Newton,  Jade Clarke and Sara Bayman.

Leeds Carnegie
In 2004 a serious knee problem forced Neville to quit netball. However after intensive rehabilitation she subsequently made a comeback and played for Leeds Carnegie during the 2007–08 Netball Superleague season.
At the same time, she also worked for Leeds Metropolitan University's sports department.

England
Neville represented England at under-18 and under-21 levels before making her senior debut in 1996. She was subsequently a member of the England teams that won bronze medals at the 1998 Commonwealth Games and the 1999 World Netball Championships. Neville made 81 senior appearances for England.

Coaching career

Team Northumbria
Neville began her senior coaching career with Team Northumbria when she served as head coach for the 2011 Netball Superleague season.

Manchester Thunder
Between 2011 and 2015 Neville served as director of netball/head coach at Northern Thunder/Manchester Thunder. She guided Thunder to Netball Superleague titles in 2012 and 2014.

England
Between 2015 and 2019 Neville served as head coach of England. She was initially appointed in March 2015 as an interim coach. However after guiding England to the bronze medal at the 2015 Netball World Cup, the appointment was made permanent in September 2015. On the eve of the World Cup tournament, Neville's father, Neville Neville, died in a Sydney hospital. He and her brothers, Phil and Gary were all in Australia to support their daughter and sister.

Neville guided England to the 2015, 2016 and 2017 European Netball Championships. She was also head coach when England won the gold medal at the 2018 Commonwealth Games. Neville later revealed that she suffered a miscarriage a day after leading England to netball Commonwealth gold.

In 2019 Neville and her twin brother, Phil, both coached England women's national teams to the semi-final stages in the 2019 Netball World Cup and 2019 FIFA Women's World Cup respectively. Phil coached the England women's national football team. After coaching England to a bronze medal at the 2019 Netball World Cup, Neville retired as head coach to start a family.

Honours

Player
Northern Thunder
Super Cup
Winners: 2002: 1
Contax
South Australia Farmers Union League
Winners: 2000

Coach
England
Commonwealth Games
Winners: 2018: 1
European Netball Championship
Winners: 2015, 2016, 2017 3
Netball Quad Series
Runners Up: 2018 (Jan), 2018 (Sep), 2019 3
Northern Thunder/Manchester Thunder
Netball Superleague
Winners: 2012, 2014: 2
Mike Greenwood Trophy
Winners: 2012, 2013, 2014

References

1977 births
Living people
English netball players
English netball coaches
England national netball team coaches
Netball players at the 1998 Commonwealth Games
Netball players at the 2002 Commonwealth Games
Commonwealth Games bronze medallists for England
Commonwealth Games medallists in netball
Adelaide Thunderbirds players
Manchester Thunder players
Yorkshire Jets players
Commonwealth Bank Trophy players
AENA Super Cup players
Netball Superleague players
Netball Superleague coaches
Manchester Thunder coaches
Sportspeople from Bury, Greater Manchester
English expatriate netball people in Australia
Tracey
Twin sportspeople
English twins
Members of the Order of the British Empire
Alumni of the University of Chester
Alumni of the University of the West of England, Bristol
Contax Netball Club players
South Australia state netball league players
1999 World Netball Championships players
Medallists at the 1998 Commonwealth Games